William Howard Evans (born 16 July 1960) is an American meteorologist and the former weatherman for WABC-TV, the ABC affiliate in New York City.

Early career
Evans's broadcasting career began at the age of 13 in his hometown of Meridian, Mississippi on WDAL Radio and WTOK-TV. He attended Mississippi State University, where he studied business administration, and Jackson State University, where he studied meteorology.

In 1985 the National Weather Service named him "Outstanding Meteorologist" for his forecasting and reporting during Hurricane Elena.

Before coming to New York, Evans was meteorologist for WALA-TV in Mobile, Alabama and was morning show host on WABB-FM. He also held similar jobs in Dallas, as both meteorologist at WFAA-TV and morning show host for KHYI-FM.

WABC-TV
Evans was the Senior Meteorologist for Eyewitness News This Morning and Eyewitness News at Noon. He is now on WLNG Radio.

Evans is a 15-time Emmy award winner for "Outstanding On-Camera Achievement in Weather Broadcasting." He had been with WABC-TV since 13 December 1989.

In 2016 Evans was awarded the prestigious Ellis Island Medal of Honor.

For years he played himself in The Christmas Spectacular at Radio City Music Hall. Evans has also played Lumiere (the candlestick) on Broadway in Disney's Beauty and the Beast. He has appeared on ABC's Good Morning America. He also appears on ESPN Sports Center and The Michael Kay Show on ESPN NY Radio 98.7 FM. Evans has appeared on the show "How Stuff Works" on the Discovery Channel
and Live with Kelly and Ryan.

Other broadcasting
Evans also reports the weather for 95.5, WPLJ-FM and sister stations NASH FM 94.7 and 77WABC in New York City.

On 14 December 2018, Evans and his wife Sandra Foschi purchased WLNG in Sag Harbor, New York.

Charitable interests

Evans helps raise funds for children's charities Babies Hospital at Columbia Presbyterian, the Juvenile Diabetes Association, Junior Achievement, and the National Young Adult Institute. He also hosts golf tournaments to raise funds for The Red Cross of New Jersey and Special Olympics of New York.

Writing
Evans' first novel Category 7: The Biggest Storm in History, was co-written by Marianna Jameson. Evans promoted the work on a 2007 book tour. The story is about "weather folk" tracking a hurricane as it approaches New York City. It comes out that the hurricane was created and directed artificially by a billionaire villain.

Evans has gone on to release more novels in the "eco-thriller" genre, including "Frozen Fire", a sequel to "Category 7", "Dry Ice", and "Blackmail Earth". Evans also penned a weather book for kids entitled: "It's Raining Fish & Spiders".

Bibliography

Notes

External links
Bill Evans of ABC News
 – Chapter 1, first few pages
  – Evans' blog from the time of his Category 7 book tour

1960 births
Television meteorologists in New York City
New York (state) television reporters
Mississippi State University alumni
Jackson State University alumni
Living people
People from Meridian, Mississippi
People from Greenwich, Connecticut
Journalists from Mississippi